Edie Huggins (August 14, 1935 – July 29, 2008) was an American television reporter, journalist and broadcaster. In 1966, Huggins became one of the first African American women to report on television in Philadelphia, remaining a fixture on WCAU-TV for 42 years; the longest consecutive television run of any Philadelphia TV news reporter in history.

Early life and career 
Huggins was born Edith "Eddie" Lou Thompson on August 14, 1935, in Saint Joseph, Missouri.  She became known as Edie (pronounced Eedee) later in life. She graduated from Bartlett High School in St. Joseph in 1953. Huggins, who still went by her given name of Edith at the time, graduated cum laude with a bachelor's degree in science from the State University of New York at Plattsburgh.

Huggins began her career by working as a registered nurse in New York City.  She was employed by both Bellevue Hospital and Flower Fifth Avenue Hospital.  Simultaneously, Huggins was hired as a consultant for the NBC daytime soap opera, The Doctors, which began airing in 1963.  Her consulting working soon led to acting roles on the drama. Her other soap opera acting credits included Love of Life and The Edge of Night which were aired on CBS.  Huggins was also cast in the 1966 film, A Man Called Adam opposite Sammy Davis Jr, Ossie Davis, Frank Sinatra, Jr. and Louis Armstrong.

WCAU-TV

Huggins was initially hired as a features reporter at WCAU-TV of Philadelphia in 1966 for a show called The Big News Team with John Facenda following a chance encounter with a broadcast executive in a New York City restaurant.  That executive was Bruce Bryan, the general manager of WCAU-TV, or Channel 10, which was a CBS network affiliate at the time. Huggins, a single mother, arrived in Philadelphia for her new job with her two children and just $65.

In a 2006 interview for her 40th anniversary with WCAU, Huggins confided that she had been hired despite a lack on-air, live television experience. She stated that the reason that she was hired was to compete against the then-local NBC affiliate, KYW-TV, which had just hired its first African American female reporter, Trudy Haynes.  Huggins, herself, made history when she joined WCAU by becoming the station's first African American female reporter.

Following her success on WCAU, the management of the television station gave Huggins her own show, Morning Side.  Huggins also co-hosted a midday news show called What's Happening during the early 1970s with Herb Clarke, weatherman.  Her other shows on WCAU included Horizons and Huggins' Heroes, which focused on ordinary local people who had accomplished notable achievements, especially for the benefit of the larger community.  Huggins Heroes became a weekly profile feature on WCAU news broadcasts during the 1990s and 2000s (decade), and highlighted Huggins's reputation as a reporter who focused on "unsung heroes" throughout the Philadelphia region.

In 2006, the Philadelphia City Council honored Huggins on her 40th anniversary at WCAU (by then an NBC affiliate) by proclaiming "Edie Huggins Day" in the city.  "Edie Huggins Day" was officially proclaimed with a resolution on March 30, 2006.

Huggins's other career honors included her induction into the Philadelphia Broadcast Pioneers Hall of Fame. She was also chosen by the Urban League of Philadelphia as one of the "Outstanding African American Philadelphians of the 20th century."  She was also honored by the Philadelphia Chapter of American Women in Radio & Television as Communicator of the Year, awarded a lifetime achievement award by the Philadelphia Association of Black Journalists and earned an award from the National Academy of Television Arts & Sciences.

Huggins was a founding member of the National Association of Black Journalists. Professionally, Huggins was often cited by colleagues as a mentor and was affectionately referred to as "Miss Edie" by younger reporters and staff throughout the Philadelphia television news industry.

In 2006, Huggins was cast in the lead role in the independent film, So Big.  The film debuted on May 3, 2008, at International House in Philadelphia.

The Broadcast Pioneers of Philadelphia inducted Edie Huggins into their Hall of Fame in 2002.

Death

Edie Huggins died of lung cancer on July 29, 2008, at the age of 72. She was survived by her two children, Hastings Edward Huggins and Laurie Linn. A memorial service held at Huggins's church, Bright Hope Baptist Church, in North Philadelphia was attended by many members of Philadelphia's media. She is interred at Mausoleum of Peace 75 of West Laurel Hill Cemetery in Bala Cynwyd.

References

External links
MSNBC: Huggins Says She Wants To Be Remembered As Someone Who Cares
Broadcast Pioneers of Philadelphia website

1935 births
2008 deaths
People from St. Joseph, Missouri
African-American journalists
Television anchors from Philadelphia
Philadelphia television reporters
American television reporters and correspondents
American soap opera actresses
Burials at West Laurel Hill Cemetery
Deaths from lung cancer in Pennsylvania
State University of New York at Plattsburgh alumni
Actresses from Missouri
20th-century American actresses
American women television journalists
20th-century African-American women
20th-century African-American people
21st-century African-American people
21st-century African-American women